Finntorp is a housing area in the municipality of Nacka, east of Stockholm, Sweden. Modern Finntorp was built from the 1940s.

Nacka Municipality